Theory & Society is a bimonthly peer-reviewed academic journal covering theoretical analyses of social processes and phenomena. It was established by Alvin Gouldner in 1974. It is published by Springer Science+Business Media and the editor-in-chief is Janet Gouldner (University of California, Davis). According to the Journal Citation Reports, the journal has a 2018 impact factor of 1.9. On average, it takes the editorial staff two years before they make a decision whether or not to accept an article.

Abstracting and indexing 
The journal is abstracted and indexed in:

References

External links 
 

Springer Science+Business Media academic journals
Bimonthly journals
English-language journals
Sociology journals
Publications established in 1974